Chariton (? – 1179) was Ecumenical Patriarch of Constantinople from 1177 to 1178, during the reign of Manuel I Komnenos.

References

Bibliography 
 
 

12th-century births
1178 deaths
12th-century patriarchs of Constantinople
Officials of Manuel I Komnenos